Ho•n•to•u•so/Su•ki•ra•i (ホ・ン・ト・ウ・ソ／ス・キ・ラ・イ / Truth and Lies/Love and Hate) is soloist misono's first single released under the pseudonym "Me" and also her first bringing in her new era. The single charted on the Oricon daily charts at #26 and remained on the charts for three consecutive weeks.

Background
Ho•n•to•u•so/Su•ki•ra•i is Japanese singer misono's first single bringing in her new era and seventeenth overall. It is also her first single released under the pseudonym "Me." The single debuted on the Oricon Singles Charts and #26, but dropped to take the #46 slot for the week, remaining on the charts for three weeks. The single was her seventh consecutive double a-side and was her only release in the year of 2011.

The single was released in three editions, each containing different material: CD, CD+DVD and a limited edition CD+DVD combo. The limited edition carried alternate cover art with the characters from the Tales of Symphonia: The Animation, the full animated theme song on the DVD and an alternate version of the music video for her collaborative song "with you," which she performed with BACK-ON, along with her solo version on the CD.

"Ho•n•to•u•so" was used as the theme song to Tales of Symphonia: The Animation World United (テイルズオブ シンフォニアTHE ANIMATION世界統合編). "Su•ki•ra•i" was used as the ending theme to the television program Akko ni Omakase! throughout the months of October and November.

For both "Ho•n•to•u•so" and "Su•ki•ra•i," misono worked with Susumu Nishikawa of the Japanese band Diamond Head. She had previously worked with Nishikawa for her song "...Suki xxx" and during her time in the group day after tomorrow. On the limited editions of the single, misono performed a solo version of the song "with you," which she had originally performed with BACK-ON in February of that year.

Track listing

CD only version

CD+DVD

Tales of version

References

External links
misono Official Site

2011 singles
2011 songs
Anime songs
Misono songs
Avex Trax singles
Songs written by Misono